Sok Pheng is a Cambodian politician. He belonged to the Sam Rainsy Party and was elected to represent Kampong Thom Province in the National Assembly of Cambodia in 2003 as one of the youngest members at the age of 29.
He is now the secretary of state of the council of ministers and vice-president of councillor of jurists.

References

Year of birth missing (living people)
Living people
Candlelight Party politicians
Members of the National Assembly (Cambodia)